Abbas Obeid (born December 10, 1973) is a former Iraqi football player. He played for Anyang LG Cheetahs and Pohang Steelers of the South Korean K League. He was also capped for the Iraq national football team.

Abbas played at the 2000 Asian Cup in Lebanon where his performances earned him a place in the Asian XI voted by the AFC.

Career statistics

International goals
Scores and results list Iraq's goal tally first.

Managerial statistics

References

External links
 
 
 

1979 births
Living people
Association football midfielders
Iraqi footballers
Iraq international footballers
Iraqi expatriate footballers
2000 AFC Asian Cup players
Al-Talaba SC players
FC Seoul players
Pohang Steelers players
bahrain SC players
K League 1 players
Expatriate footballers in South Korea
Expatriate footballers in Bahrain
Iraqi expatriate sportspeople in Bahrain